Fryburg (also Freyburg, Freyburgh, or Fryburgh) is an unincorporated community located in central Pusheta Township, Auglaize County, Ohio, United States.

It is located between Wapakoneta and Botkins. The community is served by the Wapakoneta City School District and the Wapakoneta (45895) post office.

History
Fryburg was laid out in 1848 at the site of a former Native American settlement. A post office was established at Fryburg in 1847, and remained in operation until 1903. A community landmark is St. John's Catholic Church, which is listed on the National Register of Historic Places.

References

Unincorporated communities in Auglaize County, Ohio
Unincorporated communities in Ohio
1848 establishments in Ohio
Populated places established in 1848